Verrasztó is a surname. Notable people with the surname include:

Dávid Verrasztó (born 1988), Hungarian swimmer
Evelyn Verrasztó (born 1989), Hungarian swimmer
Zoltán Verrasztó (born 1956), Hungarian swimmer

Hungarian-language surnames